Matty Bowen was a professional rugby league footballer who played in the 1920s. He played at club level for Featherstone Rovers (Heritage № 19).

Club career
Matty Bowen made his début for Featherstone Rovers on Saturday 1 October 1921.

References

External links
Search for "Bowen" at rugbyleagueproject.org

English rugby league players
Featherstone Rovers players
Place of birth missing
Place of death missing
Year of birth missing
Year of death missing